California's 27th district may refer to:

 California's 27th congressional district
 California's 27th State Assembly district
 California's 27th State Senate district